David Russell Hinson (born March 2, 1933) is an American aircraft pilot, former head of Midway Airlines, and former administrator of the Federal Aviation Administration.

David R. Hinson is best known for the three years, 1993 to 1996, during which he served as Administrator of the Federal Aviation Administration (FAA) as an appointee of President Bill Clinton.
Hinson oversaw the government's response to the ValuJet Flight 592 crash on May 11, 1996, in the Florida Everglades, for which he received heavy criticism. A column in the Chicago Tribune called for Hinson to be fired by President Clinton. According to the NTSB, the airline had improperly transported cabin chemical-oxygen generators in the cargo hold, which started a fire on board when the initiation pins were jostled and the oxygen generators began to flow.  The chemical reaction inside the metal canisters created tremendous heat, ignited tires adjacent to the canisters, and the oxygen fed the fire. Eventually the cabin filled with smoke and fire from the cargo hold area.

Mr. Hinson, a graduate of the University of Washington with a B. A. degree, has been involved with flying since 1954, when he entered flight school with the Navy. After a ten-year hitch in the military (including both active and reserve status) In 1961, he flew as a pilot for Northwest Airlines and as an instructor pilot for United Air Lines. He then joined West Coast Airline (later renamed Hughes Airwest) for ten years (1963–73) as captain and as Director of Flight Standards and Engineering.

In 1973, Hinson moved on to other ventures, notably Hinson-Minella, Inc., a limited partnership whose investments included Flightcraft, Inc., a distributorship for Beech Aircraft in the Pacific Northwest. Then, in 1978, he joined with three other people to start Midway Airlines, which he served as chairman for six years (1985–91). While working as the Executive Vice President for Douglas Aircraft, a subsidiary of McDonnell Douglas, President Clinton appointed him to head the FAA. Changes enacted by Hinson included a "One Level of Safety" program, which was intended to raise safety standards for commuter airlines.

On November 11, 1996, as Hinson was preparing to leave the FAA, he discussed some of the issues that still faced the agency.
 The ValuJet DC-9 crash in the Everglades, which killed 110 people, embarrassed his boss, the Secretary of Transportation, Federico Peña, who had publicly announced that the airline was safe. Hinson had concurred in this announcement. Yet in the following month, the FAA had grounded the airline. Hinson then said that the grounding was for violations by the airline that were unrelated to the crash.

 A TWA 747 bound for Paris with 230 people aboard exploded off of Long Island. All aboard were killed, and evidences of explosives were found in the wreckage. The cause of the crash was still unknown, months afterward. The FAA explained that all large planes,"...are likely to have evidence of explosives, whether they have been bombed or not, because of the procedures used when dogs are put through bomb-sniffing exercises on board."

A Wyoming crash in July killed a 7-year old girl who was trying to become the youngest person ever to fly across the country. Two adults in the plane also died. The FAA mostly failed trying to convince the public that, "...its rules on who may fly a plane were adequate, and none had been broken."

 A new French-built turboprop plane crashed in Indiana. The cause was found to be an undetected susceptibility to detect icing, causing the National Transportation Safety Board (NTSB) to question whether the FAA could properly evaluate new airplane designs.

He now serves on boards at the National Air and Space Museum and the Aircraft Owners and Pilots Association. He continues to fly his own plane, a Beechcraft Duke, and has logged more than 8,000 hours in over 70 aircraft types.

References

External links 

1933 births
Living people
United States Naval Aviators
Administrators of the Federal Aviation Administration
Aviators from Oklahoma
Politicians from Muskogee, Oklahoma
Clinton administration personnel